Unimed is a Brazilian medical work cooperative and health insurance operator. It is considered the largest of its kind in the world, with more than 105,000 affiliated physicians, 386 branches and more than 15 million beneficiaries. Its name is a composite of união and médicos (Portuguese for "union" and "physicians").

Created as an alternative against capital-based health plans, the cooperative was founded in 1967 in the city of Santos, state of São Paulo, by Edmundo Castilho.

History 
With the propose to guarantee the freedom and dignity of healthy professionals and structure improvements needed by the sector at finish of 1960 decade, a doctors group affiliated to Santos Doctors Sindicate (Sindicato dos Médicos de Santos), in Sao Paulo State, sought in cooperativism an alternative model of Management based on ethics, without aim of profit and with an emphasis on the social role of medicine.

That is why, on December 18, 1967, Edmundo Castilho and 22 other doctors founded the Union of Doctors - Unimed, with Castilho as the first president.

The board of Unimed Santos went to visit cities interested in adopting the model of cooperativism and soon the Unimed expanded, first by the interior of the State and then for the rest of the Country.

In order to organize institutionally all the federations and Single companies, which began to be created at the beginning of the decade, the Unimed of Brazil was founded on November 28, 1975, during a meeting of members.

External links
 Unimed Official Homepage (In Portuguese)

Cooperatives in Brazil
Medical and health organisations based in Brazil
Health insurance companies